The Swimming portion of the 7th FINA World Aquatics Championships was held from September 5 to 11, 1994. The competition was swum in the outdoor pool at the Foro Italico. The competition consisted of 32 long course events: 16 for males and females each, 26 individual events and 6 relays in total. Events by stroke were:
freestyle: 50, 100, 200, 400, 800 (females), and 1500 (males);
backstroke: 100 and 200;
breaststroke: 100 and 200;
butterfly: 100 and 200;
individual medley (I.M.): 200 and 400;
relays: 4x100 free, 4x200 free, and 4x100 medley.

Results

Men

Legend: WR – World Record; CR – Championship Record

Women

Legend: WR – World Record; CR – Championship Record

Medal table

References

 
1994 World Aquatics Championships
Swimming at the World Aquatics Championships
1994 in swimming